Pour être libre is a studio album by French singer Lââm, released on 26 September 2005.

It was a re-edition of Lââm's 2004 self-titled album. Some songs were left out, and some new songs ("Petite Sœur", "Pour être libre" and "Elle est toujours là") were added. The track order was also different.

"Petite Sœur" was released as a single six weeks prior to the album, on 15 August 2005, and "Pour être libre" was released as a single on 17 February 2006.

Reception 
The album debuted at number 50 in France for the week of 1 October 2005, eventually climbing to its peak position of number 15 in March of the next year.

Track listing

Charts

References 

2005 albums
Heben Music albums
Lââm albums